Andrea Rose Salinas (born December 6, 1969) is an American politician serving as the U.S. representative for  since 2023. Oregon's 6th congressional district includes all of Yamhill and Polk counties, the part of Marion County that includes Salem and Woodburn, a small piece of Beaverton, and the suburban communities to the southwest of Portland, including Tigard, Tualatin and Sherwood.

A member of the Democratic Party, Salinas served as the Oregon State Representative for the 38th district, which includes the City of Lake Oswego and portions of southwestern Portland, from 2017 to 2023.

Early life education and career
Salinas is the daughter of an immigrant from Mexico. She was born in San Mateo, California and grew up in Pleasant Hill, California. She is a first-generation student who graduated from the University of California, Berkeley.

In 2004 Salinas registered as a federal lobbyist on behalf of the National Treasury Employees Union. She lobbied for two years before moving to Portland, where she later lobbied from 2015 to 2017.

Early political career 
After graduating from Berkeley, Salinas was a legislative aide to U.S. Senator Harry Reid and U.S. Representatives Pete Stark and Darlene Hooley. She then worked as the legislative director of the Oregon Environmental Council. She left the Oregon Environmental Council to start her own legislative consulting practice. And before joining the Oregon House of Representatives, she was the Oregon Vice President of Strategies 360, a political consulting firm.

In September 2017, Salinas was appointed to fill the vacancy in district 38 of the Oregon House of Representatives created when Ann Lininger was appointed to the Clackamas County Circuit Court. Salinas completed Lininger's term, and was reelected in 2018 and 2020.

In the 81st Oregon Legislative Assembly, she served in the leadership team as the majority whip. She also was the chair of the House Committee on Health Care. In the 2022 Regular Session, Salinas was a Chief Sponsor of HB 4002. HB 4002 mandated overtime pay for farmworkers in Oregon. The bill passed along party lines.

U.S. House of Representatives

2022 election 
In November 2021, Salinas announced her candidacy to represent Oregon's new congressional district. This announcement came with controversy, as she did not live in the district. But living in the district is not a requirement for Congress. Salinas said that if she won the race, she would move into the district.

On November 8, 2022, Salinas won the open seat with 50.1% of the vote, defeating Republican Mike Erickson. After the election, Erickson filed a lawsuit against Salinas over a television ad. The lawsuit initially sought to block her from taking office. He sued under a state law that allows a judge to set aside election results if the judge determines that a false statement by the victor swayed voters enough to change the election’s outcome. During a December hearing, Erickson indicated through his attorney that he did not wish to overturn the election results, but was still seeking hundreds of thousands of dollars in damages because of Salinas campaign ads that said he had been charged with drug possession. Salinas is being represented by the Portland law firm Markowitz Herbold PC and the Elias Law Group.

In the 118th Congress, Salinas is the freshman representative for the Congressional Hispanic Caucus.

Caucus memberships 

 Congressional Progressive Caucus
 Congressional Hispanic Caucus

Committee assingments 

 Committee on Agriculture
 Committee on Science, Space, and Technology

Personal life
Salinas lives with her husband and daughter in Lake Oswego.

Salinas is Roman Catholic.

See also

List of Hispanic and Latino Americans in the United States Congress

References

External links

 Congresswoman Andrea Salinas official U.S. House website
 Andrea Salinas for Congress campaign website

 

|-

1969 births
21st-century American politicians
21st-century American women politicians
American politicians of Mexican descent
American Roman Catholics
Catholics from Oregon
Democratic Party members of the Oregon House of Representatives
Democratic Party members of the United States House of Representatives from Oregon
Female members of the United States House of Representatives
Hispanic and Latino American members of the United States Congress
Hispanic and Latino American state legislators in Oregon
Hispanic and Latino American women in politics
Living people
Politicians from Lake Oswego, Oregon
Politicians from Portland, Oregon
University of California, Berkeley alumni
Women state legislators in Oregon